The Manor of St. Sepulchre (also known as the Archbishop's Liberty) was one of several manors, or liberties, that existed in Dublin, Ireland since the arrival of the Anglo-Normans in the 12th century. They were townlands united to the city, but still preserving their own jurisdiction. St. Sepulchre's was under the jurisdiction of the Archbishop of Dublin, although from time to time the Dublin city government claimed ownership of it.

Location
The importance of the Manor of St. Sepulchre was enhanced in that it consisted of a number of manors, many of which lay outside the city or even the county of Dublin. The manor of St. Sepulchre in the city was the principal manor. The city manor boundaries stretched from Bishop St. to St. Stephen's Green, along Harcourt Street to Donnybrook, across Rathgar to Harold's Cross and back along Clanbrassil Street. In 1523-4 Archbishop Hugh Inge was engaged in a legal dispute with the Mayor and Corporation of Dublin, who had apparently taken possession of the manor.

An Act of the Parliament of Ireland of 2 June 1774 (13 & 14 Geo.III c.34) formed a barony, the Barony of St. Sepulchre, from that part of the manor lying north of the South Circular Road. This had previously been part of the barony of Uppercross. Within it were the civil parishes of St. Kevin, St. Nicholas Without and part of St. Peter's. The barony was abolished by the Dublin Baronies Act 1842 (5 & 6 Vict. c.96), when the area was transferred from the county to the city.

Outside the city, there were manors belonging to St. Sepulchre's in Swords, Lusk, Shankhill, Tallaght, Finglas and other places. Each of these manors was governed by a portreeve, who was sworn in each Easter by the seneschal of St. Sepulchre.

Privileges
In return for the support of the Archbishop, or to alleviate certain hardships suffered by Englishmen or the church in Ireland, privileges were granted to the manor (that is, to the archbishop and his successors) at various times and by various kings of England. These allowed the city manor (and its constituent manors outside the city) to have their own courts of justice (Courts Leet, Courts Baron and a Court of Record, where they were allowed to try all crimes except "forestalling, rape, treasure-trove and arson"), free customs, freedom from certain taxes and services, impose their own fines, have their own coroners, rights of salvage, maintain their own fairs and markets, regulate weights and measures, etc. For those condemned to death, the archbishop had his own gallows at Harold's Cross.

These rights and privileges were ended by the Manor Court of Saint Sepulchre Abolition Act 1856, the last such jurisdiction remaining in Ireland.

Administration

The headquarters of the city manor (and consequently, of all St. Sepulchre manors) was the Palace of St. Sepulchre, located now where Kevin St. Garda barracks stands. This was originally constructed by John Comyn, the first Anglo-Norman Archbishop of Dublin, appointed in 1180. The name was suggested by the campaigns being waged by the Crusaders for the recovery of the Holy Sepulchre from the Muslims. Comyn was shortly after granted land by the monarchy for the See of Dublin, which provided the basis for the manor. This palace remained the seat of the Archbishops of Dublin until 1806.

A courthouse (still standing) and gaol for the use of the manor were built in the early 19th century at the corner of Long Lane and Bride St. Most of the prisoners were insolvent debtors. Much of the business of the court related to trading, fairs, weights and measures matters. Attending court was difficult for those manor residents living outside the city, in Swords, Lusk or elsewhere, most of whom were quite poor. The same difficulty applied to jurors, who were fined for not attending court when summoned. All income from court activity went to the Archbishop.

In 1813 the population of this manor was 3,728 males and 5,273 females.

References

Sources
 
 For medieval liberty boundaries see

Citations

History of Dublin (city)
Baronies of County Dublin
Former baronies of Ireland
Places in Dublin (city)